The Alfred Duma Local Municipality council consists of seventy-three members elected by mixed-member proportional representation. Thirty-seven councillors are elected by first-past-the-post voting in thirty-seven wards, while the remaining thirty-six are chosen from party lists so that the total number of party representatives is proportional to the number of votes received.

It was established for the August 2016 local elections by the merging of Emnambithi/Ladysmith and Indaka local municipalities.

In the election of 3 August 2016 the African National Congress (ANC) won a majority of forty-six seats on the council, while in 2021, the Inkatha Freedom Party won a plurality of thirty-three seats.

Results 
The following table shows the composition of the council after past elections.

August 2016 election

The following table shows the results of the 2016 election.

November 2021 election

The following table shows the results of the 2021 election.

References

Alfred Duma
Elections in KwaZulu-Natal
Uthukela District Municipality